Ramone Christie Samuels (born 3 November 1994 in Somerset West, South Africa) is a South African rugby union player for the  in Super Rugby and  in the Currie Cup. He can play as a flanker, number eight or hooker.

Rugby career

Youth rugby / Western Province

Samuels attended Paul Roos Gymnasium in Stellenbosch and a he earned a provincial call-up to represent  at the 2010 Under-16 Grant Khomo Week in Upington, scoring a try in their 28–7 victory over the Golden Lions

He also represented Western Province at the premier South African high schools competition, the Under-18 Craven Week, on two occasions – at the 2011 tournament in Kimberley and the 2012 tournament in Port Elizabeth.

He played in eleven of their twelve matches during the competition, initially playing as a hooker, but starting their final six matches as an eighth man.

Golden Lions

He was named in their squad for the 2014 Vodacom Cup, but didn't make any appearances in the competition. He played off the bench in their semi-final match against trans-Jukskei rivals , but could not prevent the side from Pretoria winning 23–19 to eliminate Samuels' side from the competition.

Despite being named in the Golden Lions' senior squad for the 2015 Currie Cup Premier Division, he reverted to the Under-21 squad, where he started nine of their matches in Group A of the 2014 Under-21 Provincial Championship and came on as a replacement in one more match. He scored a try in each of their matches against  – helping them secure a 73–14 win in Port Elizabeth and a 40–24 win in Johannesburg – as the golden Lions finished in fourth place to secure the final semi-final berth. Samuels ended on the losing side in the semi-finals of the competition for the second season in a row as  won 43–20 in Cape Town.

In 2016, Samuels was included in the  squad for the 2016 Currie Cup qualification series. He made his Super Rugby debut by coming on as a replacement for Akker van der Merwe in the 63rd minute of the match.

Stormers / Western Province

At the start of 2017, Samuels moved to Cape Town, where he joined the  Super Rugby team and the  Currie Cup team.

Personal life

Samuels is the older brother of Damian Willemse, also a professional rugby union player (Samuels' birth was registered under his mother's maiden name). Both brothers were members of the  squad that won the 2017 Currie Cup Premier Division.

References

South African rugby union players
Living people
1994 births
Cape Coloureds
People from Somerset West
Rugby union hookers
Rugby union flankers
Rugby union number eights
Golden Lions players
Lions (United Rugby Championship) players
Rugby union players from the Western Cape